The National Museum of Iceland (Icelandic: Þjóðminjasafn Íslands ) was established on 24 February 1863, with Jón Árnason the first curator of the Icelandic collection, previously kept in Danish museums.

Collections
The second curator, Sigurður Guðmundsson, advocated the creation of an antiquarian collection. The museum was called the Antiquarian Collection until 1911 when its name changed to the National Museum of Iceland. Before settling at its present location, at Suðurgata 41, 101 Reykjavík, in 1950, it was housed in various Reykjavík attics, including in the attic of the Culture House for 40 years.

The museum's permanent exhibit is about Icelandic history and includes about 2,000 objects. A key object in the permanent exhibition is the Valþjófsstaður door, a celebrated carving depicting a version of the Lion-Knight legend where a knight slays a dragon, thus freeing a lion that becomes his companion.

See also
 Höfðaletur - related to carvings at the Museum

References

External links

Official website including information in English

1863 establishments in Iceland
Museums established in 1863
Museums in Reykjavík
National museums of Iceland
History museums in Iceland